The Palala or Lephalala River, also called the Rhooebok-river by Thomas Baines, is a river in South Africa.  This river's catchment basin is a sub-watershed of the Limpopo River.

It is a significant watercourse in the Waterberg area of Limpopo Province. The river drains much of the Lapalala Wilderness area and considerable additional lands that are important habitat for native wildlife in a zone with considerable ongoing bushveld restoration.  The predominantly dry deciduous forest community of the upland portion of the Palala River watershed is home to many large African mammals including Blue Wildebeest, Giraffe, White Rhino and numerous bovids.

The Palala River has been shown to exhibit high water quality with very clear flowing waters, especially in the uppermost regions; correspondingly biotic health has been assessed as healthy using the North African catfish as a bio-marker.  Interesting prehistoric rock paintings exist on bluffs along the river in the Lapalala Wilderness area.

River biota
There are a variety of fauna that inhabit the Palala River including fish, Nile crocodile, African Rock Python and hippopotamus.  In a 2004 study of the river's health, specimens of the North African catfish, Clarias gariepinus, were captured within reaches of the Lapalala Wilderness.  A healthy population of male and female fish was found in the river's upper reaches within the Lapalala Wilderness, manifesting normal body mass averaging approximately 1.1 kilograms; moreover, this fish population from the higher reaches of the Palala River was found to be free of parasites and also free of liver damage.  The health of the upper reaches was such that the upper Lapala was used in subsequent studies as the healthy control group to compare to other South African rivers which were more polluted from discharge of untreated sewage and agricultural wastes within their watersheds.

Geology and hydrology

The underlying rock formation of the Palala River basin derives from the Kaapvaal craton, formed as a precursor island roughly 2.7 billion years ago. This crustal formation became the base of the Waterberg, which was further transformed by upward extrusion of igneous rocks. These extruded rocks, containing minerals such as vanadium and platinum, are called the Bushveld igneous complex, leading to the colourful bluff faces along much of the Palala River.  The original extent of this rock upthrust involved  about 250,000 square kilometers, and is sometimes called the Waterberg Supergroup.

Sedimentary deposition from the Palala, Mokolo River and other rivers cutting through Waterberg continued through the era of 2.5 billion to 250 million years ago.  Around 250 million years ago the supercontinent Gondwana split into its modern day continents.  The Palala River catchment basin today contains swamps, bushveld, mesas,  and some kopje outcrops.

Prehistoric rock paintings

On vertical cliffs above the Palala River are some locations of significant prehistoric Bushman rock paintings dating to approximately 8000 BC.  These paintings are produced on vertical rock faces, with the best specimens being protected by large rock overhangs.  The works depict hunting scenes and various native game, especially antelopes.  The media used are paints produced with dyes concocted from native plants and soil minerals;  the paints themselves have proved to be remarkably resistant to millennia of weathering.

These sites are very difficult to access, since there are no paved roads for access; in fact, even after a four-wheeled drive over deeply mudded and rutted bushveld roads, there is a considerable hike over swampy terrain. Furthermore, these sites are appropriately not well marked or defined on park maps. After reaching the general area of the paintings, one must descend approximately halfway down the vertical bluffs along the Palala; assistance from a knowledgeable native guide is essential

Waterberg Massif
Much of the Palala River course is through the Waterberg Biosphere, a massif of approximately 15,000 square kilometers.  Waterberg is the first region in the northern part of South Africa to be named as a Biosphere Reserve by  UNESCO.   The extensive rock formation was shaped by hundreds of millions of years of riverine erosion to yield diverse bluff and butte landform. The ecosystem can be characterised as a dry deciduous forest or Bushveld. Within the Waterberg there are archaeological finds dating to the Stone Age, and nearby are early evolutionary finds related to the origin of humans.

See also
Drainage basin A
 List of rivers of South Africa
Bushmen
Rock painting
Nile crocodile

References

External links

Palala River water quality and biota studies: site selection

 
Rivers of Limpopo